Blue Island–Vermont Street is a Metra station in Blue Island, Illinois, servicing the Rock Island District and Metra Electric District Lines.

On the Rock Island Line, as of 2022, Blue Island-Vermont Street is served by 37 trains in each direction on weekdays, by all 16 inbound trains and all 17 outbound trains on Saturdays, and by all 14 trains in each direction on Sundays.

On weekdays, 16 inbound trains originate from Vermont Street and 16 outbound trains terminate at Vermont Street. On weekends, six inbound trains originate from Vermont Street and six outbound trains terminate at Vermont Street. All trains that terminate/originate from here travel along the Rock Island’s Beverly Branch.

On the Metra Electric Line, as of 2022, Blue Island is served by eight inbound trains and 10 outbound trains on weekdays, and by four trains in each direction on Saturdays. There is no service on the Blue Island branch of the Metra Electric Line on Sundays or holidays.

The two stations share the same parking facilities and the same bus connections. Although these two stations are across the street from each other and trains do not use the same platform areas, the proximity of the two to each other functionally allows riders to transfer from one to the other with only a very short walk (less than an eighth of a mile) between them.

Blue Island-Vermont Street is one of the busiest stations on the Rock Island District. It is the centerpiece of the entire line, historically and presently. Many trains terminate here, most of them locals on the Beverly Branch, and most rush hour trains stop at this station, running express to and from this station. A coach yard is located just north of the station and is used to store out-of-service trains when not in use.

Vermont Street is a favorite of railfans due to its unique four-track setup, frequent train action, and switching movements. Later on in the day, Iowa Interstate Railroad runs a daily freight train along the Rock Island tracks, from Blue Island to Council Bluffs, Iowa. For this reason, this daily freight train is officially named the BICB. Blue Island's police and fire departments are located several blocks away from Vermont Street.

Blue Island–Vermont Street station and Blue Island station are both in zone D of Metra's zone-based fare system. As of 2018, Blue Island-Vermont Street station on the Rock Island District is the 84th busiest of Metra's 236 non-downtown stations, with an average of 595 weekday boardings. Blue Island station on Metra Electric is the 164th busiest of Metra's 236 non-downtown stations, with an average of 197 weekday boardings.

History
Rock Island service was established in Blue Island in 1852, and the current brick station at Vermont Street replaced the original frame depot in 1868.  The Beverly Branch splits from the main line here and runs at the base of the ridge serving stations in Blue Island and the Chicago neighborhoods of Morgan Park and Beverly before veering east to serve Brainard and reconnecting to the main line at the Gresham station at 87th and Vincennes. This branch line was created in 1889 through the influence of the Blue Island Land and Building Company to serve its interests in the development of what was then the village of Morgan Park and carries most of the passenger traffic for the area, although some rush-hour trains travel north-east on the main line. In 1891, the Metra Electric station was built as a branch of the Illinois Central's commuter line from Kensington-115th Street.

On July 12, 1971, the station began service to Amtrak trains. (The sited station list shows non-Amtrak stations, and mentions that at the top of the page.  The cash-starved Rock Island couldn't afford to join Amtrak, and ran their own intercity passenger trains until Illinois withdrew the operating subsidy and service was terminated on December 31, 1978.) By the 1980s, the station became part of the Metra system.

Tracks
The station has six tracks for in-service trains, four for the Rock Island and two for the Metra Electric. Of the Rock Island platforms, two are on the Beverly Branch, and two are on the main line. Each branch has one side platform, but all four tracks can be accessed. Most trains on the Beverly Branch terminate at this station, (except late at night,) and run inbound back to LaSalle Street Station.

The Metra Electric station, being a stub terminus, has two tracks and one island platform. It is currently the only accessible station on the Blue Island branch, and one of only two stations on the branch to have more than one track, the other being  where the line has a passing siding.

Bus connections
Pace

References

External links 

Old image of former Rock Island Station (Rock Island Technical Society)
Station from Vermont Street from Google Maps Street View

Metra stations in Illinois
Former Chicago, Rock Island and Pacific Railroad stations
Vermont Street (Metra)

Railway stations in Cook County, Illinois
Railway stations in the United States opened in 1868
1868 establishments in Illinois
Former Illinois Central Railroad stations
1891 establishments in Illinois
Railway stations in the United States opened in 1891